Maximilian Kieffer (born 25 June 1990) is a German professional golfer who plays on the European Tour.

Career
Kieffer was born in Bergisch Gladbach. He played most of his golf at Hubbelrath Golf Club in Düsseldorf, the same club as Martin Kaymer. He represented the German National team from 2005-2010 and represented Europe in the Junior Ryder Cup in 2006. He played college golf briefly in the United States at the University of Florida. He turned professional in 2010.

Kieffer joined the Challenge Tour in 2011 and won his first tournament in 2012 at the Gujarat Kensville Challenge in India.

In April 2013, Kieffer lost in a sudden-death playoff at the Open de España. In the joint longest playoff in European Tour history, Kieffer was beaten by a Raphaël Jacquelin birdie on the ninth playoff hole.

In May 2015, during the third round of the Dubai Duty Free Irish Open, Kieffer broke the Royal County Down course record set in 1939 by shooting 6-under-par 65.

In April 2021, Kieffer lost in a sudden-death playoff again at the Austrian Golf Open. He was defeated by John Catlin on the fifth extra hole when he hit three balls into the water. The following week, Kieffer carded a final-round 62 to finish runner-up again at the Gran Canaria Lopesan Open.

In August 2022, Kieffer claimed his first European Tour victory at the D+D Real Czech Masters. He won by one shot ahead of Gavin Green.

Professional wins (2)

European Tour wins (1)

*Note: The 2022 D+D Real Czech Masters was shortened to 54 holes due to weather.

European Tour playoff record (0–2)

Challenge Tour wins (1)

1Co-sanctioned by the Professional Golf Tour of India

Challenge Tour playoff record (1–1)

Results in major championships

CUT = missed the halfway cut
Note: Kieffer only played in the U.S. Open.

Team appearances 

Amateur
 Junior Ryder Cup (representing Europe): 2006 (tie, Cup retained)
 European Boys' Team Championship (representing Germany): 2007, 2008
 Jacques Léglise Trophy (representing the Continent of Europe): 2007, 2008
 European Amateur Team Championship (representing Germany): 2008, 2009, 2010
 Eisenhower Trophy (representing Germany): 2010
 St Andrews Trophy (representing the Continent of Europe): 2010 (winners)

Professional
World Cup (representing Germany): 2013, 2018

See also 
 2012 Challenge Tour graduates

References

External links 

 
 
 Florida Gator profile

German male golfers
European Tour golfers
Olympic golfers of Germany
Golfers at the 2020 Summer Olympics
Florida Gators men's golfers
People from Bergisch Gladbach
Sportspeople from Cologne (region)
Sportspeople from Düsseldorf
1990 births
Living people